Lasiocampa trifolii, the grass eggar, is a moth of the family Lasiocampidae first described by Michael Denis and Ignaz Schiffermüller in 1775 and found in Europe.

Distribution and habitat
It is found in Europe in coastal dunes.

Life cycle and behaviour
Eggs are laid on leaves close to the ground, hatch in the autumn, and the young larvae hibernate. The larvae feed on grasses, various shrubs and deciduous trees, such as oak, European beech, poplar and Calluna. The cocoon is formed on the ground.

Adults' wingspan is 40–55 mm and it flies from June to September depending on the location (in Britain it is on the wing in August). They fly during the day, but also at night, and will come to a light. The female is larger than the male.

References

External links

Grass eggar at UKMoths
Lepiforum.de

Lasiocampidae
Moths of Europe
Moths of Asia
Moths described in 1775
Taxa named by Michael Denis
Taxa named by Ignaz Schiffermüller